Aloina is a genus of mosses belonging to the family Pottiaceae first described by Nils Conrad Kindberg. It has a cosmopolitan distribution.

Species 
The following species are recognised in the genus Aloina:
 Aloina aloides (Koch ex Schultz) Kindb.
 Aloina ambigua (Bruch & Schimp.) Limpr.
 Aloina apiculata (E.B. Bartram) Delgad.
 Aloina bifrons (De Not.) Delgad.
 Aloina brevirostris (Hook. & Grev.) Kindb.
 Aloina calceolifolia (Spruce ex Mitt.) Broth.
 Aloina catillum (Müll. Hal.) Broth.
 Aloina cornifolia Delgad.
 Aloina hamulus (Müll. Hal.) Broth.
 Aloina humilis M. T. Gallego, Cano & Ros
 Aloina macrorrhyncha (Kindb.) Kindb.
 Aloina recurvipatula (Müll. Hal.) Broth.
 Aloina rigida (Hedw.) Limpr.
 Aloina roseae (R.S. Williams) Delgad.
 Aloina sedifolia (Müll. Hal.) Broth.
 Aloina sullivaniana(Müll. Hal.) Broth.

References

Pottiaceae
Moss genera